For certain applications in linear algebra, it is useful to know properties of the probability distribution of the largest eigenvalue of a finite sum of random matrices.  Suppose  is a finite sequence of random matrices.  Analogous to the well-known Chernoff bound for sums of scalars, a bound on the following is sought for a given parameter t:

The following theorems answer this general question under various assumptions; these assumptions are named below by analogy to their classical, scalar counterparts. A summary of related works is given.

Matrix Gaussian and Rademacher series

Self-adjoint matrices case
Consider a finite sequence  of fixed,
self-adjoint matrices with dimension , and let  be a finite sequence of independent standard normal or independent Rademacher random variables.

Then, for all ,

where

Rectangular case
Consider a finite sequence  of fixed, self-adjoint matrices with dimension , and let  be a finite sequence of independent standard normal or independent Rademacher random variables.
Define the variance parameter

Then, for all ,

Matrix Chernoff inequalities
The classical Chernoff bounds concern the sum of independent, nonnegative, and uniformly bounded random variables.
In the matrix setting, the analogous theorem concerns a sum of positive-semidefinite random matrices subjected to a uniform eigenvalue bound.

Matrix Chernoff I
Consider a finite sequence  of independent, random, self-adjoint matrices with dimension .
Assume that each random matrix satisfies

almost surely.

Define

Then

Matrix Chernoff II
Consider a sequence  of independent, random, self-adjoint matrices that satisfy

almost surely.

Compute the minimum and maximum eigenvalues of the average expectation,

Then

The binary information divergence is defined as

Matrix Bennett and Bernstein inequalities
In the scalar setting, Bennett and Bernstein inequalities describe the upper tail of a sum of independent, zero-mean random variables that are either bounded or subexponential. In the matrix
case, the analogous results concern a sum of zero-mean random matrices.

Bounded case
Consider a finite sequence  of independent, random, self-adjoint matrices with dimension .
Assume that each random matrix satisfies

almost surely.

Compute the norm of the total variance,

Then, the following chain of inequalities holds for all :

Subexponential case
Consider a finite sequence  of independent, random, self-adjoint matrices with dimension .
Assume that 

Compute the variance parameter,

Then, the following chain of inequalities holds for all :

Rectangular case
Consider a finite sequence  of independent, random, matrices with dimension .
Assume that each random matrix satisfies

almost surely.
Define the variance parameter

Then, for all 

holds.

Matrix Azuma, Hoeffding, and McDiarmid inequalities

Matrix Azuma
The scalar version of Azuma's inequality states that a scalar martingale exhibits normal concentration about its mean value, and the scale for deviations is controlled by the total maximum squared range of the difference sequence.
The following is the extension in matrix setting.

Consider a finite adapted sequence  of self-adjoint matrices with dimension , and a fixed sequence  of self-adjoint matrices that satisfy

almost surely.

Compute the variance parameter

Then, for all 

The constant 1/8 can be improved to 1/2 when there is additional information available. One case occurs when each summand  is conditionally symmetric.

Matrix Hoeffding
Placing addition assumption that the summands in Matrix Azuma are independent gives a matrix extension of Hoeffding's inequalities.

Consider a finite sequence  of independent, random, self-adjoint matrices with dimension , and let  be a sequence of fixed self-adjoint matrices.
Assume that each random matrix satisfies

almost surely.

Then, for all 

where

An improvement of this result was established in :
for all 

where

Matrix bounded difference (McDiarmid)
In scalar setting, McDiarmid's inequality provides one common way of bounding the differences by applying Azuma's inequality to a Doob martingale.  A version of the bounded differences inequality holds in the matrix setting.

Let  be an independent, family of random variables, and let  be a function that maps  variables to a self-adjoint matrix of dimension .
Consider a sequence  of fixed self-adjoint matrices that satisfy

Compute the variance parameter

Then, for all 

where .

for all 

where  and

Survey of related theorems
Recall the theorem above for self-adjoint matrix Gaussian and Rademacher bounds:
For a finite sequence  of fixed,
self-adjoint matrices with dimension  and for  a finite sequence of independent standard normal or independent Rademacher random variables, then 

where

Ahlswede and Winter would give the same result, except with 
.
It is never larger than the Ahlswede–Winter value (by the norm triangle inequality), but can be much smaller. Therefore, the theorem above gives a tighter bound than the Ahlswede–Winter result.

The procedure given in the derivation below. All of the recent works on this topic follow this same procedure, and the chief differences follow from subsequent steps. Ahlswede & Winter use the Golden–Thompson inequality to proceed, whereas Tropp  uses Lieb's Theorem.

Suppose one wished to vary the length of the series (n) and the dimensions of the
matrices (d) while keeping the right-hand side approximately constant.  Then
n must vary approximately as the log of d.  Several papers have attempted to establish a bound without a dependence on dimensions.  Rudelson and Vershynin  give a result for matrices which are the outer product of two vectors.   provide a result without the dimensional dependence for low rank matrices.  The original result was derived independently from the Ahlswede–Winter approach, but  proves a similar result using the Ahlswede–Winter approach.

Finally, Oliveira  proves a result for matrix martingales independently from the Ahlswede–Winter framework.  Tropp  slightly improves on the result using the Ahlswede–Winter framework.  Neither result is presented in this article.

Derivation and proof

Ahlswede and Winter
Let  be a random self-adjoint matrix.  Then

To prove this, fix  .  Then

The second-to-last inequality is Markov's inequality. The last inequality holds since .

Thus, our task is to understand   Nevertheless, since trace and expectation are both linear, we can commute them, so it is sufficient to consider , which we call the matrix generating function. The immediately following presentation follows .

The Golden–Thompson inequality implies that 
, where we used the linearity of expectation several times.
Suppose . Noting that , then

Iterating this, we get

In turn, this can be bounded. At any rate, one can see how the Ahlswede–Winter bound arises as the sum of largest eigenvalues.

Tropp

Proof: Let .  Then Lieb's theorem tells us that

is concave.
The final step is to use Jensen's inequality to move the expectation inside the function:

This gives us the major result of the paper: the subadditivity of the log of the matrix generating function.

Subadditivity of log mgf
Let  be a finite sequence of independent, random self-adjoint matrices.  Then for all ,

Proof:  It is sufficient to let .  Expanding the definitions, we need to show that 

To complete the proof, we use the law of total expectation.

Define .

Finally, we have

where at every step m we use Tropp's corollary with

Master tail bound
The following is immediate from the previous result:

All of the theorems given above are derived from this bound; the theorems consist in various ways to bound the infimum.  These steps are significantly simpler than the proofs given.

References

 
 
 
 
 
 
 
 
 
 

Linear algebra